Rida Zouhir-Takedam (born November 23, 2003) is a Canadian professional soccer player who plays as a midfielder for CF Montréal.

Early life
Zouhir is of Moroccan descent. He began playing with CS Braves D’Ahuntsic when he was five, quickly being moved up to playing with the eight-year olds. In 2016, he joined the Montreal Impact Academy.

Club career 
On December 4, 2020, Zouhir signed his first homegrown contract with Montreal Impact, later renamed CF Montréal to begin in the 2021 season. Zouhir made his professional debut with Montreal in a 2–1 loss against DC United on August 8, 2021. Upon completion of the 2021 MLS season, CF Montréal would announce that they would exercise the option on Zouhir's contract for 2022.

International career 
On March 23, 2022, Zouhir was named to the Moroccan U-20 team. He made one appearance for the U20s against the Romania U20s in a 2–2 friendly tie on 29 March 2022.On May 13, 2022 he was named to the 60-man provisional Canadian U-20 and on June 10, 2022, Zouhir was officially called up by the Canadian U-20 team for the 2022 CONCACAF U-20 Championship.

Career statistics

Notes

References

External links
 
 CF Montreal Profile

2003 births
Living people
Soccer players from Montreal
Canadian soccer players
Canada men's youth international soccer players
Moroccan footballers
Morocco youth international footballers
Canadian people of Moroccan descent
Association football midfielders
CF Montréal players
Homegrown Players (MLS)
Major League Soccer players
Première ligue de soccer du Québec players